The 2013–14 East of Scotland Football League was the 85th season of the East of Scotland Football League. Whitehill Welfare were the reigning champions, but not defend their title after moving to the Lowland League.

The league was split into two separate divisions, the Premier Division and the First Division. This season saw a reduction in the number of clubs from 26 to 20, due to the departure of nine clubs who left to join the inaugural Lowland Football League, although additional reserve teams joined the league to boost numbers.

Premier Division

The 2013–14 Premier Division saw a reduction in the number of clubs from twelve to ten, due to the departure of seven clubs to the newly-formed Lowland Football League.  As a result, Edinburgh University and Tynecastle retained their place in the division despite finishing in the previous season's relegation places. Three clubs were promoted from the First Division and two reserve teams also entered the division.

Teams

The following teams changed division after the 2012–13 season.

To Premier Division
Promoted from First Division
 Coldstream
 Craigroyston
 Leith Athletic

Spartans and Stirling University entered reserve teams after their move to the Lowland Football League.

From Premier Division
Transferred to Lowland Football League
 Edinburgh City
 Gretna 2008
 Preston Athletic 
 Spartans
 Stirling University
 Vale of Leithen
 Whitehill Welfare

Stadia and locations

League table

First Division

The First Division also saw a reduction in the number of clubs, from fourteen to ten. This was due to the departure of two clubs to the newly-formed Lowland Football League and promotion of additional clubs to rebalance the number of clubs with the Premier Division.

Teams

The following teams changed division after the 2012–13 season.

To First Division
 Hibernian Colts

From First Division
Promoted to Premier Division
 Coldstream
 Craigroyston
 Leith Athletic

Transferred to Lowland Football League
 Gala Fairydean Rovers
 Selkirk

Stadia and locations

League table

References

5